Kurandi is a village in Tamil Nadu, in southern India.

References

Villages in Virudhunagar district